Robert entered Lloyd's Register in 1815 as an American prize. Until 1822 the brig was a West Indiaman based in Liverpool and sailing to the Bahamas or Havana. On 2 February 1817 Lloyd's List reported that Robert, Wilkes, master, had been sailing from New Providence to Liverpool when she struck a reef off Egg Island and had to put back for repairs.

In 1822 she was under the command of Captain R. Fields, or R. Fyldes, or Fieldes, or Robert Fildes. He sailed her to go seal hunting in the South Shetland Islands, where she was lost on 7 March 1822.

Robert anchored in Clothier Harbour for most of the season. There ice damaged her. Several other whaling captains surveyed her and declared her a total loss. Her crew were saved.

Robert Fildes
Fildes in 1821 introduced the name Livingston Island for the second largest island in the South Shetlands, popular until then as 'Friesland Island' and also known as 'Smolensk Island'.

Fildes may have named Robert Island for Robert.

Fildes Strait, between King George Island and Nelson Island, in the South Shetland Islands, is named for Robert Fildes.

Citations

References
 
 
 

1814 ships
Ships built in the United States
Captured ships
Age of Sail merchant ships of England
Sealing ships
Maritime incidents in March 1822